Saharat Hiranthanapuwadol or formerly name Wirat Chanpakdee, Singharat Chanpakdee, Thananat Ruang-ngam, Thanto Ruang-ngam and Thanto Hiranthanapuwadol. His nickname Singto means lion.  Saharat is a singer in Thailand, best known for The Star 5

He won The Star 5 Thailand, the youngest The Star winner in the show's history.

Profile 
In the past, His name was "Wirat Chanpakdee" He was born on 3 June 1992 in Khonkaen, Thailand. He graduated in faculty of engineer from Thammasat University, He is now commander of an Air-forcer (soldier).

Filmography

Television dramas
 2010 Traa Barb See Kaw (2010) (ตราบาปสีขาว) (Exact-Scenario/Ch.5) as Songkran (สงกรานต์) with Ploy Tanida Tanawuth
 2012 Buang Ruk 2012 (บ่วงรัก) (Exact-Scenario/Ch.5) as young Tanin (Cameo) (ธานินทร์ (ตอนหนุ่ม) (รับเชิญ)) with Cee Hataipat Smathvithayavech
 2013 Pan Ruk Pan Rai 2013 (แผนรัก แผนร้าย) (Exact-Scenario/Ch.5) as Chinsanu (ชิษณุพงศ์) with Cee Hataipat Smathvithayavech
 2013 Hua Jai Rua Puang (หัวใจเรือพ่วง) (Exact-Scenario/Ch.5) as Harit (ธาริศ) with Gypsy Keerati Mahapruekpong
 2014 Likay Likay (ลิเก๊..ลิเก) (Exact-Scenario/Ch.5) as Fahprathan (ฟ้าประทาน) with Charm Irvin Osathanond 
 2015 Poo Ying Kon Nun Chue Boonrawd (ผู้หญิงคนนั้นชื่อบุญรอด) (Exact-Scenario/One 31) as Jin (จินต์) with Charebelle Lanlalin Tejasa Weckx
 2019 Sanya Kaen Saen Rak (สัญญาแค้นแสนรัก) (The One Enterprise/One 31) as Sonthaya (สนธยา) with Ploy Patchara Sridara
 2022  (ปาฏิหาริย์รัก) (/PPTVHD36) as 

Television series
 20  (The One Enterprise/One 31) as 

Television sitcom
 2011 Pen Tor (เป็นต่อ) (The One Enterprise/One 31) as Seu (เสือ) 
 2011  (ระเบิดเถิดเทิง ลั่นทุ่ง) (Workpoint Entertainment/Ch.5) as Keng (เก่ง)
 2012  (ครอบครัวขำ) (Scenario/Ch.3) as soldier (ทหาร) 
 2020 Pen Tor (เป็นต่อ ตอน ) (The One Enterprise/One 31) as Seu (Cameo) (เสือ (รับเชิญ))

Award 
 The winner of The Star 5

Music 
 Pleng née (In the meaning of "This song" )
 Hua Koi (Head & tail)
 Sa-dut Rak
 Khae Dai Rak

References 
 Singto's Profile

Other Singto's Site & Data 
 Pleng nee on imeem
 Lion King Club (Thailand)
 The Official site of THESTAR CONTEST
 Singto-thestar5.com (Thailand)

Saharat Hiranthanapuwadol
Living people
Saharat Hiranthanapuwadol
1992 births
Saharat Hiranthanapuwadol
Saharat Hiranthanapuwadol
Saharat Hiranthanapuwadol
Saharat Hiranthanapuwadol
Saharat Hiranthanapuwadol
Saharat Hiranthanapuwadol
Saharat Hiranthanapuwadol